Ermis Aradippou is a Cypriot professional football club based in Aradippou, a settlement on the outskirts of the city of Larnaca. The club was formed in 1958, and currently plays in the Cypriot Second Division. Ermis' greatest success came in 2014, when they won the Super Cup. Ermis have a long-standing rivalry with their neighbouring club Omonia Aradippou.

History
Ermis spent most of its history in the Cypriot Second Division, first competing in the top flight in 1983, and appearing in two more editions of the competition during that decade.

After being relegated in 2002, the club returned to division one for 2009–10, managing to stay afloat for the first time in its history, after finishing in ninth position. In the 2011–12 season the club was relegated to the second division after three successive seasons in the top flight. The club has achieved a record four successive seasons in the top flight since 2013.

Honours
Cypriot Super Cup (1):
2014
Cypriot Second Division (3):
1982–83, 1984–85, 2008–09
Cypriot Third Division (3):
1975–76, 1996–97, 2006–07

European record

Notes
 3Q: Third qualifying round

Players

Out on loan

For recent transfers, see Cyprus Football Association.

Managers
 Dušan Mitošević (2009–10)
 Demetris Ioannou (interim)'' (2010)
 João Carlos Pereira (2010–11)
 Panayiotis Xiourouppas (2011)
 Nicos Panayiotou (2013–14)
 Nikodimos Papavasiliou (2014–15)
 Mitchell van der Gaag (2015)
 Ioannis Okkas (2015)
 Pavlos Dermitzakis (2015)
 Nicos Panayiotou (2015–2017)

Affiliated club
 Ermis Zoniana

References

External links
 Official website

 
Football clubs in Cyprus
Association football clubs established in 1958
1958 establishments in Cyprus
Football clubs in Larnaca